Carmichael College is an educational institution in Rangpur, Bangladesh. It was established on 10 November 1916 and was named after Thomas David Baron Carmichael of Skirling.

The college is situated in Lalbag,  to the south from zero point of the Rangpur town. Having an area of 900 bighas (298 acres), it is the largest college of Bangladesh.

History
To create higher education opportunity in Rangpur region, the then local landlords (zamindars), including Abdul Aziz Choudhury, Gopal Lal Roy Bahadur, Mohimaranjan Roy, and Babu Monidra Chandra Roy, took initiative to set up a college. Local people also came forward to help them. Finally the college was established at Lalbag,  to the south from zero point of the town. The first Governor of Bengal, Lord T.D.G. Carmicheal, inaugurated the college in 1916 and it was named after him.

From the beginning the college was under Calcutta University. It is then nationalized on 1 July 1963. Then in 1992, it came under Bangladesh National University.

Academics
More than 25,000 students in HSC, Honors and Masters levels are currently studying in this college. The HSC education is controlled by Board of Intermediate and Secondary Education, Dinajpur when 18 Honors and Masters subjects are taught according to the guidance of Bangladesh National University

Students

Eleventh Science: 300
Eleventh Arts: 300
Eleventh commerce: 300
First year (Honors): 3230
Masters (1st phase): 6000 (regular+private)
Masters (final phase): 6000 (regular+private)

Admission
The admission rule of Board of Intermediate and Secondary Education and National University, Bangladesh is strictly followed by the college. Eligible students are selected according to the result of Secondary School Certificate examination and Higher Secondary Examination by Board of Intermediate and Secondary Education and National University, Bangladesh.

Campus
Having a huge area of 298 acre, the college campus is adorned with academic buildings, tree orchards, ponds and other infrastructures. There are a number of magnificent buildings in the college. These buildings are as old as the college itself. A big library, Shaheed Minar commemorating the martyrs of language movement in 1952, Liberation war monument, a beautiful mosques and a gymnasium are also in the campus.

Department and subject

Higher Secondary
Science
Arts
Commerce

Hon's and Masters
	Bengali		
	English
	Arabic & Islamic Studies		
	Urdu
	History	
	Islamic History & Culture
	Philosophy	
	Political Science
	Sociology	
	Economics	
	Marketing		
	Finance & Banking	
	Accounting
	Management	
	Physics
	Chemistry
	Mathematics
	Botany		
	Zoology

Notable alumni
Abdullah al Mahmood, lawyer and politician

 Raufun Basunia, student leader, was killed during an anti-autocratic protest against military ruler Hussain Muhammad Ershad in 1985. 
 Rebati Mohan Dutta Choudhury
 Hossain Muhammad Ershad, former President of Bangladesh
 Anisul Hoque
 Nasir Hossain   
 Jahanara Imam
 Asaduzzaman Noor
 Abu Sadat Mohammad Sayem
 Maqbular Rahman Sarkar, academic and tenth vice-chancellor of Rajshahi University
 Muhammad Sohrab Hossain, Ex-Minister. Twice MNA Pakistan, Prominent Minister holding 8 ministry in Sheikh Mujib's cabinet. One of the founding fathers of Bangladesh and President of the first ever meeting in the Jessore District after the Liberation of Bangladesh.
 Mostafizur Rahman Mostafa, Bangladeshi Politician and Current Mayor of Rangpur.

Gallery

References

Further reading
 

 
Educational institutions established in 1916
Colleges affiliated to National University, Bangladesh
Colleges in Rangpur District
Universities and colleges in Rangpur District
1916 establishments in British India